The 2018 MFA Cup is the 47th edition of the MFA Cup, the knockout football competition of Mauritius.

First round
[Mar 13]

US BBRH                      3-0 Firestars

La Caverne                    -  Swansea

Roche-Bois Dauphins          0-2 Belin SC

St Catherine FC              4-2 GRA Rovers

[Mar 14]

Savanne Galets               2-1 El Classico

Black Rhinos                 1-3 La Gaulette Sharks

Round of 32
[Apr 4]

AS Rivière du Rempart        0-4 Petite Rivière Noire FC

[Apr 5]

Chamarel SC                  0-2 Savanne SC

R. du Rempart Star Knitwear  0-7 Pamplemousses SC

[Apr 6]

GRSE Wanderers               2-2 Ent. Boulet Rouge-Riche Mare [GRSE on pen]

St Catherine FC              0-0 CS Jeanne d'Arc              [4-2 pen]

[Apr 7]

Grande Rivière Noire WC      0-3 Belin SC

Grand Bel Air Spurs          0-1 Mont Roches Lovelets

US BBRH                      2-1 W.B. Albion Barkly

Quatre-Bornes Swansea        0-4 Port Louis Black Horns

Curepipe Starlight           3-5 ASPL 2000

[Apr 9]

Chebel Citicens              1-2 AS Quatre Bornes   

PAS Mates                    0-3 Roche-Bois Bolton City

[Apr 11]

La Cure Waves                0-0 La Gaulette Sharks           [Sharks on pen]

AS Vacoas/Phoenix            lt  La Cure Sylvester

Upper Vale Starlight         bt  Savanne Galets  

[Apr 13]

US Trou-aux-Biches           2-3 Cercle de Joachim

Round of 16
[Apr 21]

La Gaulette Sharks           1-3 Roche-Bois Bolton City

Cercle de Joachim            0-2 Petite Rivière Noire FC

Upper Vale Starlight         0-3 ASPL 2000

Belin SC                     0-3 Savanne SC

Mont Roche Lovelets         0-10 La Cuire Sylvester

GRSE Wanderers               3-2 St Catherine FC

AS Quatre-Bornes             0-1 US BBRH  

Pamplemousses SC             5-0 Port Louis Black Horns

Quarterfinals
[May 8]

Roche-Bois Bolton City       2-0 Petite Rivière Noire FC

Savanne SC                   0-2 Pamplemousses SC

ASPL 2000                    4-4 GRSE Wanderers              [1-3 pen]

La Cure Sylvester            5-0 US BBRH

Semifinals
[May 18]

Pamplemousses SC             2-1 La Cure Sylvester

GRSE Wanderers               1-0 Roche-Bois Bolton City

Final
[May 22]

Pamplemousses SC             2-1 GRSE Wanderers

See also
2017–18 Mauritian Premier League

References

Mauritius
Cup
Mauritian Cup